Sangeet Kalpataru (literal meaning: "Wish fulfilling tree of music".) is a Bengali language song anthology edited and compiled by Swami Vivekananda (as Narendranath Datta) and Vaishnav Charan Basak. The book was first published in August or September 1887 from Arya Pustakalaya, Calcutta. In 2000, the book was reprinted by the Ramakrishna Mission Institute of Culture. It was edited with a critical introduction by Dr. Sarbananda Choudhury.

Content 
The book was a compilation of Bengali songs. It also discussed different aspects of vocal and instrumental music. The book was divided into different sections and songs were arranged by theme. The first sections included patriotic songs. The book included twelve Rabindra Sangeets.

It contained 90-page long introduction which discussed the theory of music and 18-page long biographical notes and sketches on Bengali songwriters and poets such as Chandidas, Vidyapati, Ramprasad.

The book was compiled by Narendranath before he became an ascetic. Of the 12 songs in the book, four were written by Rabindranath Tagore of which three songs were taught by him to Vivekananda and to a few others. These songs were sung in chorus by Vivekananda and others during the marriage of Leeladevi, daughter of Rajanarain Basu that was held at Sadharan Brahmo Samaj. Narendranath had also written three songs before the publication of the book, one of which he used to sing at the Baranagore Monastery.

Some of the songs of the book were—

Publication and republication 
Sangeet Kalpataru was first published in August or September 1887 from Arya Pustakalay, 118, Upper Chitpur Road, Calcutta. The compilers of the book were credited as "Sri Narendranath Datta B. A. and Vaishnav Charan Basak". Narendranath collected and arranged most of the songs of this compilation, but could not finish the work of the book for unfavourable circumstances. The authorship of the 18-page appendix to the book, which gives brief biography of the Bengali poets such as Chandi Das, Vidyapathi and Ramdas is not mentioned. However, in the fourth edition, Naredndranath's name was dropped. In 2000, the book was reprinted by Ramakrishna Institute for Culture, Calcutta.

Depictions 
The book and the relationship between Swami Vivekananda and Rabindranath Tagore and Tagore family was depicted in 2013 Bengali drama Bireswar. The drama produced by Belgharia Shankhamala theatre group.

References

Explanatory notes

Citations

Sources 
 
 
 
 
 

1887 books
Works by Swami Vivekananda
Anthologies